Chlorzoxazone (INN) is a centrally acting muscle relaxant used to treat muscle spasm and the resulting pain or discomfort. It can also be administered for acute pain in general and for tension headache (muscle contraction headache). It acts on the spinal cord by depressing reflexes.  It is sold under the brand names Lorzone, Paraflex and Muscol and in combination form as Parafon Forte, a combination of chlorzoxazone and acetaminophen (paracetamol).  Possible side effects include dizziness, lightheadedness, malaise, nausea, vomiting, and liver dysfunction. Used with acetaminophen it has added risk of hepatotoxicity.

It is available as a generic medication.

Like metaxalone, its mechanism of action is still in question. It is believed that metaxalone works by altering serotonin levels and acting as a mild MAO inhibitor. The mechanism of action of chlorzoxazone is thought to act on Gaba-A & B receptors and voltage-gated calcium channels to a degree. General central nervous system depression is the only currently accepted aspect to its medical benefits. Elucidation of the exact mechanism of action is ongoing but there is limited study due to the existence of more effective, safe muscle relaxants (ex. diazepam, cyclobenzaprine, tizanidine), greatly limiting the potential benefit of identifying novel compounds which share chlorzoxazone's mechanism of action.

See also
 Zoxazolamine

References

Further reading

External links 
 
 Chloroxazone Safety Data Sheet 
 D.F. Marsh,  (1959)

Muscle relaxants
Carbamates
Chloroarenes
CYP3A4 inhibitors
Benzoxazoles
Hepatotoxins